Katrina Trask (May 30, 1853 – January 8, 1922), also known as Kate Nichols Trask, was an American author and philanthropist.

Life account 

She was born Kate Nichols in Brooklyn, New York to George Little Nichols and Christina Mary Cole.  Her father was a partner in a large importing firm.

She married Spencer Trask, a prominent Wall Street banker and financier, on November 12, 1874.  Her husband was a director of several railroads and the president of the Edison Illuminating Company of New York.  He also helped plan and finance the reorganization of the New York Times in 1896.

Katrina was the mother of four children, all of whom died in infancy or childhood.  Spencer was killed in a railroad accident in 1909. In 1913 Katrina suffered several heart attacks and spent much of the remainder of her life developing and financing Yaddo, an artists' community in Saratoga Springs, New York, where she was an invalid.

On February 6, 1921, she married longtime family friend George Foster Peabody.  Katrina died less than a year later in 1922, and is buried at Yaddo.

Career 
In 1878 she wrote Colorado Leaves, and in 1888 the Chronicles of Yaddo. Her first book, Under King Constantine, was published anonymously in 1892.  The book contains three long love poems and was written in three days under intense mental strain.  She hid the poems away for years until finally persuaded by her husband to have them published.  It went through five editions and beginning with the second edition she started identifying herself as Katrina Trask.

She published Free Not Bound (1903), a novel, and Night & Morning (1907), a narrative in blank verse; both were about love and marriage.  In 1908 she wrote King Alfred’s Jewel, a historical drama also in blank verse.

As an avid pacifist she wrote an antiwar play, In the Vanguard which appeared a year before World War I and went through eight editions and was performed by women clubs and church groups.

Works 
 Colorado Leaves  1878
 Chronicles of Yaddo  1888
 Under King Constantine  1892
 Sonnets and Lyrics  1894
 White Satin and Homespun  1896
 John Leighton, Jr.: a novel  1898
 Lessons in Love  1900
 Free Not Bound  1903
 Mors Et Victoria [a Drama]  1903
 Night & Morning  1907
 King Alfred’s Jewel  1908
 In the Vanguard  1913
 The Statue of Peace  1914
 The Mighty and the Lowly  1915
 The Invisible Balance Sheet 1916
 Without the Walls: A Reading Play  1919

References

Sources
 Weber, H. R. "Trask, Kate Nichols" Notable American Women, Vol. 3, 4th ed., The Belknap Press of Harvard University Press, 1975

External links

 
 
 yaddo.org

1853 births
1922 deaths
People from Brooklyn
American women writers
People from Saratoga Springs, New York
Burials in Saratoga County, New York